A pious fiction is a narrative that is presented as true by the author, but is considered by others to be fictional albeit produced with an altruistic motivation.  The term is sometimes used pejoratively to suggest that the author of the narrative was deliberately misleading readers for selfish or deceitful reasons.  The term is often used in religious contexts, sometimes referring to passages in religious texts.

Examples

Religious context
 Mainstream historical interpretations of the Hebrew Bible (i.e. the Tanakh or the Protestant Old Testament) often consider portions of the Tanakh/Jewish Bible to be a pious fiction, such as the conquests of Joshua and the histories of the Pentateuch. The Book of Daniel has also been described as a pious fiction, with the purpose of providing encouragement to Jews.
 Mainstream historical-critical approaches sometimes views stories in the New Testament such as the Virgin Birth, the Visit of the Magi to Jesus, and others, as pious fictions.
 The relationship between the modern celebration of Christmas and the historical birth of Jesus has also been described as such.

Other contexts
 Fredrick Pike describes some morale-boosting efforts during the Great Depression as pious fictions.
 In the episode "In the Pale Moonlight" of the science fiction television series Star Trek: Deep Space Nine, Captain Benjamin Sisko struggles with the ethical dilemma after he conspires with Elim Garak to convince the Romulans to enter the war on their side by producing fake evidence of The Dominion plotting an attack on the Romulans.

See also 

 Morality play
 Myth
 Noble lie
 Pious fraud

Notes

Deception
Ethics
Fiction
Religion